Pay-as-you-use (or pay-per-use) is a payment model in cloud computing that charges based on resource usage. The practice is similar to the utility bills (e.g. electricity), where only actually consumed resources are charged.

One major benefit of the pay-as-you-use method is that there are no wasted resources (that were reserved, but not consumed), which can be a source of significant losses for the companies. Users only pay for utilized capacities, rather than provisioning a chunk of resources that may or may not be used.

Payment model concept evolution
Cost efficiency is one of the most distinctive and advertised benefits of cloud computing alongside the ease of use. Due to cloud computing rapid development, the utilized payment model is also evolving.

Subscription is the most basic payment model that provides periodic access to a product or service. The main benefit is a predictable fixed cost, which is independent of the consumption rate or whether the service is used at all. The downside of the model is that it is difficult to forecast the consumption beforehand, which leads to overallocation.

Pay-as-you-go (also may be referred to as pay-as-you-run, pay-as-you-allocate, etc.) is the most frequently used payment model at the moment. The main idea is that users only pay for the provisioned server (virtual machine) when it is running (going). However, in terms of resources pay-as-you-go approach charges fully for the allocated resources (i.e. VM limit) regardless of the actual consumption.

Pay-as-you-use is the most recent payment model in cloud computing that emerged after integration and popularization of the containers in the clouds. It is centered on the containers' ability to dynamically scale the amount of provided resources without downtime (vertical scaling). As a result, the charges can be made based on the actual consumption during the specific time.

Role in solving the right-sizing problem
Right-sizing is a process of reserving the cloud computing instances (containers, VMs, or bare metal) with enough resources (RAM, CPU, storage, network) to achieve a sufficient performance at the lowest cost possible.

Right-sizing aims to solve two problems in cloud computing:
 Overallocation, which leads to inefficient utilization of the cloud infrastructure and overpayment for resources that are not actually used.
 Underallocation, which results in resource shortage that causes performance issues or even downtime of the hosted projects, leading to the poor end-user experience, missed clients, and revenue losses.

Currently, the pay-per-use model is the most efficient answer to the right-sizing problem. It allows avoiding manual prediction on the required server size by shifting this responsibility to the precise tools offered by modern cloud hosting providers. As a result, applications are automatically provided with the exact amount of resources to serve the on-going load.

Discrepancy in Terminology
Due to lack of unified terminology and relative novelty, the pay-as-you-use term in cloud computing is often confused with similar ones like pay-as-you-go, pay-as-you-run, pay-as-you-allocate, etc. The terms are mixed up especially frequently in the marketing materials due the appealing word structure "pay only for the resources you use", while with pay-as-you-go pricing is primarily based on the instance size but not real resource consumption.

References

Cloud computing
Payment terms